Paul Jerry Bookout (born June 30, 1962) is an American politician who served as the President pro tempore of the Arkansas Senate from 2011 to 2013, when he resigned from office. A member of the Democratic Party, Bookout served as an Arkansas Representative from 1999 until 2004 and as an Arkansas Senator from 2006 to 2013. Bookout was convicted of wire fraud in 2014.

Early life and education
Paul Bookout was born on June 30, 1962, in El Dorado, Arkansas, to Jerry and Loretta (née Langford) Bookout. He graduated from Arkansas State University.

Political career
Bookout served in the Arkansas House of Representatives from 1999 to 2004, when he was elected to fill the seat of his late father, Jerry, who had held the seat from 1973 to 1997, and again from 2003 until his death.  Paul Bookout then served in the Arkansas Senate from 2006 until 2013 during which time he also served as the President pro tempore of the Senate from 2011 to 2013.

Criminal investigation and resignation
Bookout resigned as the President pro tempore and as an Arkansas Senator in 2013 after it was discovered he spent campaign funds on personal expenses.

On March 11, 2015, Bookout entered a negotiated plea in federal court to a felony mail fraud count for using interstate communications to file a false report in the scheme. On March 2, 2016, he was sentenced to 18 months in federal prison. U.S. District Judge Brian Miller also ordered Bookout to pay $150,048 in restitution, according to court records. He reported to prison on May 2, 2016. Under the agreement Bookout was ordered to pay about $150,158, though it is not certain who will get the money, the state or contributors.

The crime could have carried a sentence up to 20 years. Judge Brian Miller noted he could depart from guidelines, in either direction. The amount he owes is the amount from two campaign cycles studied by prosecutors within the three-year period under which charges could be filed. But he spent far more over the years in a similar manner. Bookout was released from prison on July 17, 2017.

See also
 List of American state and local politicians convicted of crimes

References

1962 births
20th-century American businesspeople
20th-century American politicians
20th-century Baptists
21st-century American businesspeople
21st-century American politicians
21st-century Baptists
American people convicted of fraud
Arkansas politicians convicted of crimes
Democratic Party Arkansas state senators
Arkansas State University alumni
Baptists from Arkansas
Businesspeople from Arkansas
American funeral directors
American hospital administrators
Living people
Democratic Party members of the Arkansas House of Representatives
People from El Dorado, Arkansas
Politicians convicted of mail and wire fraud
Politicians from Jonesboro, Arkansas
Presidents pro tempore of the Arkansas Senate